Alexander Cochran may refer to:

Alexander Gilmore Cochran (1846–1928), U.S. Representative from Pennsylvania
Alexander Smith Cochran (1874–1929), businessman and philanthropist

See also
Alexander Cochrane (disambiguation)